Polpenazze del Garda is a comune in the province of Brescia, in Lombardy, northern Italy. It is situated near the western shore of Lake Garda.

World heritage site
It is home to one or more prehistoric pile-dwelling (or stilt house) settlements that are part of the Prehistoric Pile dwellings around the Alps UNESCO World Heritage Site.

References

Cities and towns in Lombardy